Leslie Hogben is an American mathematician specializing in graph theory and linear algebra, and known for her mentorship of graduate students in mathematics. She is a professor of mathematics at Iowa State University, where she holds the Dio Lewis Holl Chair in Applied Mathematics; she is also professor (by courtesy) of electrical and computer engineering at Iowa State, associate dean for graduate studies and faculty development at Iowa State, and associate director for diversity at the American Institute of Mathematics.

Education and career
Hogben graduated summa cum laude in 1974 from Swarthmore College, and completed her Ph.D. in 1978 at Yale University. Her dissertation, Radical Classes of Jordan Algebras, concerned ring theory and was supervised by Nathan Jacobson.

She joined Iowa State University as a tenure-track instructor in 1978. There, she was tenured in 1983, promoted to full professor in 2006, and given the Dio Lewis Holl Chair in 2012. She added her courtesy appointment in electrical and computer engineering in 2013. She was named associate dean in 2019.

Hogben became associate director for diversity at the American Institute of Mathematics in 2007.

Books
Hogben is the editor of the Handbook of Linear Algebra (CRC Press, 2007; 2nd ed., 2014) and the author of the textbook Elementary Linear Algebra (West Publishing, 1987).

Recognition
The Association for Women in Mathematics has included her in the 2020 class of AWM Fellows for "being an endless champion for women in mathematics for nearly 40 years; for her outstanding record of involvement in programs to promote equal treatment and equal opportunities for women and minorities in mathematics". In 2020, she was elected Fellow of the American Association for the Advancement of Science, in the Section on Mathematics.

Personal life
Hogben is the daughter of C. A. M. Hogben, a physiologist at George Washington University and later the University of Iowa. She is the granddaughter of British zoologist and medical statistician Lancelot Hogben and of his wife, demographer Enid Charles. She married mathematician Mark Hunacek, who became an associate teaching professor at Iowa State.

References

External links
Home page

Year of birth missing (living people)
Living people
20th-century American mathematicians
21st-century American mathematicians
American women mathematicians
Graph theorists
Swarthmore College alumni
Yale University alumni
Iowa State University faculty
Fellows of the Association for Women in Mathematics
20th-century American women
21st-century American women